Severe Tropical Storm Sam, also known in the Philippines as Tropical Storm Luding, was a relatively strong storm that formed in August 1999. It brought severe impacts to the Philippines and southeastern China, causing 20 deaths.

Meteorological history 

On August 17, an area of circulation within the monsoon trough located in the Philippine Sea became more organized and the JTWC issued a TCFA. The developing cyclone slowly moved to the northwest, becoming Tropical Depression 16W nine hours after the TCFA was first issued. As the cyclone continued to intensify, it became Tropical Storm Sam on August 19. Around this time, the subtropical ridge to Sam's north shifted its track in a westwards direction towards Luzon. The storm passed over the north of the island on August 20 and entered the South China Sea reaching typhoon strength the next day. Sam continued to move to the northwest over China dissipating about 24 hours later. PAGASA named the developing storm Luding shortly before the JTWC began to issue advisories.

Impact 
Typhoon Sam was responsible for seven deaths in the Philippines. In addition, flooding from its rainfall displaced over 4000 people, and many major roads were closed due to landslides near Baguio. Sam became the wettest tropical cyclone to affect Hong Kong since records began in 1884, dropping over 616 mm (24.2 inches) of rain, exceeding the previous record set in 1926. Peak sustained winds of 96 km/h (60 mph) were recorded on Waglan Island as the typhoon passed over the territory. The heavy rain led to many instances of flooding and over 150 landslides throughout Hong Kong, killing 1 person and forcing the evacuation of about 1,000. A total of 328 people were injured in various incidents relating to the storm, and total losses in Hong Kong totaled to approximately $17 million. In addition to the direct casualties from the storm, China Airlines Flight 642, using an MD-11 aircraft, crashed while attempting to land at Hong Kong International Airport, killing three on board and injuring 219. At the time of the crash wind gusts in excess of 65 km/h (40 mph) were recorded at the airport. After moving into China, Sam killed at least 17 and injured 100 people in Guangdong. Direct economic losses in the province were about $18 million.

See also 
Other storms with the same name

References 

Sam
Typhoons in Hong Kong
1999 in Hong Kong